Maltego is software used for open-source intelligence and forensics, developed by Paterva from Pretoria, South Africa. Maltego focuses on providing a library of transforms for discovery of data from open sources, and visualizing that information in a graph format, suitable for link analysis and data mining. As of 2019, the team of Maltego Technologies headquartered in Munich, Germany has taken responsibility for all global customer-facing operations.

Maltego permits creating custom entities, allowing it to represent any type of information in addition to the basic entity types which are part of the software.  The basic focus of the application is analyzing real-world relationships (Social Networks, OSINT APIs, Self-hosted Private Data and Computer Networks Nodes) between people, groups, Webpages, domains, networks, internet infrastructure, and social media affiliations. Maltego extends its data reach with integrations from various data partners. Among its data sources are DNS records, whois records, search engines, social networking services, various APIs and various meta data.

About the Products 
Maltego has paid commercial desktop client softwares with options to self-host the servers. Maltego CaseFile is a free commercial desktop client software with features limited to offline manual graph creation.

A free Community Edition account can be created on the Maltego CE account registration page. The desktop client, after installation can be activated to any Maltego type: XL, Classic, CE, and CaseFile.

Maltego is commonly used by enterprises, security researchers and private investigators.

See also

 King & Union Avalon
 Analyst's Notebook
 Data Re-Identification
 Deanonymization
 Palantir Technologies
 SPSS Modeler

References

External links

 
 Maltego Introduction and Personal Recon
 Visualizing DomainTools Data with Maltego

Data analysis software
Domain Name System
Internet architecture